Luther Lawrence (September 28, 1778 – April 17, 1839) was the Mayor of Lowell, Massachusetts (1838–1839). In 1818, Lawrence purchased 25 shares of the Suffolk Bank, a clearinghouse bank on State Street in Boston.

Early life and family
Lawrence was the son of American Revolutionary, Samuel Lawrence, patriarch of the Lawrence family from Boston. Luther's brothers, William, Abbott, and Amos, all became influential figures in United States history.

Death
Lawrence died on April 17, 1839 when he fell into a wheel pit while showing a visitor around his mill.

References

1778 births
1839 deaths
Harvard College alumni
Massachusetts lawyers
Mayors of Lowell, Massachusetts
Speakers of the Massachusetts House of Representatives
Members of the Massachusetts House of Representatives
Massachusetts Federalists
People from Groton, Massachusetts
19th-century American lawyers